is a Japanese manga series written and illustrated by Kouji Mori. It was serialized in Shueisha's seinen manga magazine Weekly Young Jump from October 2010 to October 2016, with its chapters collected in nine tankōbon volumes.

Publication
Shueisha collected its chapters in nine tankōbon volumes, released from April 28, 2011, to January 19, 2017.

Volume list

References

Further reading

External links
  

Science fiction anime and manga
Seinen manga
Shueisha manga